Los Lagos is a Chilean city and commune in Valdivia Province, Los Ríos Region.

Demographics
Of these, 9,479 (47%) lived in urban areas and 10,689 (53%) in rural areas. The population grew by 8.6% (1,604 persons) between the 1992 and 2002 censuses.

It has a large German presence, like the entire Los Rios and Los Lagos Regions.

Administration
As a commune, Los Lagos is a third-level administrative division of Chile administered by a municipal council, headed by an alcalde who is directly elected every four years. The 2008-2012 alcalde is Samuel Torres Sepúlveda (Ind.).

Within the electoral divisions of Chile, Los Lagos is represented in the Chamber of Deputies by Enrique Jaramillo  (PDC) and Gastón Von Mühlenbrock (UDI) as part of the 54th electoral district, together with Panguipulli, Futrono, Lago Ranco, Río Bueno, La Unión and Paillaco.

References

External links
  Municipality of Los Lagos

Populated places in Valdivia Province
Communes of Chile
Populated places established in 1891
1891 establishments in Chile